Dichomeris hemeropa is a moth in the family Gelechiidae. It was described by Edward Meyrick in 1923. It is found in Amazonas, Brazil.

The forewings are light yellow ochreous, beyond the subterminal line tinged with brownish. The costal edge is black towards the base, the plical and second discal stigmata moderate, black and pale edged. There is a faint pale curved subterminal line from two-thirds of the costa to the tornus, preceded on the costa by a fuscous mark. There are also marginal fuscous pale-edged dots around the posterior part of the costa and termen. The hindwings are grey.

References

Moths described in 1923
hemeropa